Yazlav (Yaźlaw) is a rural locality (a village) in Yakshimbetovsky Selsoviet, Kuyurgazinsky District, Bashkortostan, Russia. The population was 163 as of 2010. There are 2 streets.

Geography 
Yazlav is located 28 km southwest of Yermolayevo (the district's administrative centre) by road. Yakshimbetovo is the nearest rural locality.

References 

Rural localities in Kuyurgazinsky District